Chom se Hoogte Pass is situated in the Mpumalanga province, on the R36 where it splits off from the R539 (South Africa).

Mountain passes of Mpumalanga